Ildar Vladimirovich Yubin (born June 8, 1974) is a former Russian professional ice hockey player.

External links

1974 births
Living people
Amur Khabarovsk players
Barys Astana captains
Barys Nur-Sultan players
Dayton Bombers players
HC Khimik Voskresensk players
HC Sibir Novosibirsk players
Kazakhmys Satpaev players
Lokomotiv Yaroslavl players
Russian ice hockey defencemen
Sportspeople from Yaroslavl